= Kuan Kam Hon =

Malaysian billionaire (born 1947)

Kuan Kam Hon (关锦安) is a Malaysian billionaire

Kuan founded Hartalega Holdings in the early 1980s and controls 49.3% of the company. Hartalega plans to increase its production capacity from 22 billion to 42 billion gloves a year by 2020.

In 2018, Hartalega partnered with Chemical Intelligence UK to launch the first non-leaching glove that features in-built antimicrobial technology.
